Jerry Savelle (born December 24, 1946) is an American author and televangelist who is president of Jerry Savelle Ministries International (JSMI). He has written over 70 books and has preached in more than 3000 churches and 26 nations. JSMI has offices in Tanzania, United Kingdom, Australia, Canada, and United States headquarters in Crowley, Texas.

Jerry Savelle Ministries International
Savelle first established his ministry in 1974 as a traveling ministry. His ministry has grown since then and now has offices in the United States, Australia, the United Kingdom, and Canada. He has a weekly broadcast at www.jerrysavelle.org  and on Daystar Television Network

Savelle is the Founding Pastor of Heritage of Faith Christian Center in Crowley, Texas. In January 2006, Savelle appointed Justin Bridges as Senior Pastor.

Early life and education
Before entering the ministry, Savelle worked as an autobody repairman. He grew up on the racetracks and knew he wanted to own an automotive business just like his dad from the age of nine. At the age of eleven, while watching Oral Roberts on television, Savelle felt called to go into ministry.

He went to college in 1964 and was married to Carolyn Creech in 1965. He opened Jerry's Paint and Body Shop in 1968, however in 1969 he again felt the call to go into ministry. In February 1969, Jerry gave his life to Christ. Early in his ministry he traveled and studied under Kenneth Copeland, another "Word of Faith" minister.

Partial list of Jerry Savelle Ministries International Publications and Recordings
Honoring Your Heritage of Faith (Harrison House, September 1994)  
Called to Battle Destined to Win (Regal, April 2009)  
If Satan Can't Steal Your Joy... He Can't Keep Your Goods (Harrison House, December 2010)  
Godly Wisdom for Prosperity (Harrison House, 1980)  
From Devastation to Restoration (Jerry Savelle Publications, 1998)  
Prayer of Petition (Chosen Books, 2011)  
The Favor of God (Regal, August 2012)  
In the Footsteps of a Prophet (Jerry Savelle Publications, 1999) 
The Nature of Faith (Harrison House, 1984)  
Why God Wants You to Prosper (Jerry Savelle Ministries, 2014)  
The God of the Breakthrough will visit Your House (Jerry Savelle Ministries, 2004)  
Sharing Jesus Effectively (Harrison House, 1994)  
Turning Your Adversity into Victory (Harrison House, August 1994)  
Everyday a Blessing Day (Jerry Savelle Ministries, 2013)  
The Spirit of Favor on Your House (Jerry Savelle Ministries, 2014) 
Everyday a Blessing Day (2013) ASIN B00M3CJMLQ

References

External links
Jerry Savelle Ministries International
Heritage of Faith Christian Center (Crowley, TX)

1947 births
Living people
American television evangelists
Oral Roberts University people
People from Fort Worth, Texas